Galatasaray Women's Football is a women's football section of Galatasaray S.K., a major sports club in Istanbul, Turkey.

History

Foundation years 
Galatasaray S.K. opened initially a football school for girls of age category 6-12 at its Florya Metin Oktay Facilities in the beginning of 2011. The training of girls was conducted by women trainers on weekends.

The women's football side of Galatasaray S.K. was founded in 2011. It consisted in age categories of little girls, cadets and junior girls. It was an important place in the infrastructure with the female players it has trained, The little girls became champion in the Istanbul Girls' U-13 League ("İstanbul Minik Kızlar Futbol Ligi") in 2015, the cadets played in the finals of the Turkish Girls' U-15 Championship ("Türkiye Yıldız Kızlar Futbol Şampiyonası"), and the juniors advanced to the second round of the Turkish Girls' U-17 Championship ("Türkiye Genç Kızlar Futbol Şamğiyonası"). Some members of the Yellow*Reds were admitted to the Turkey girls' national U-17 team.

Closing year 
The umbrella club's management announced the closure of the women's football department, which was active four years long, with effect of end September 2016 due to downsizing measures caused by financial issues.

Foundation of Senior Women's Team 
On September 18, 2021, the senior women's football team has been founded. Nurcan Çelik was appointed as the first coach.

Sponsorship naming 
Due to sponsorship deals, Galatasaray have been also known as:
 Galatasaray (2011–2016)
 Galatasaray Hepsiburada (2021–2022)
 Galatasaray Petrol Ofisi (2022–present)

Stadium 

The team played their home matches in the 2021-2022 season at Yeşilova Kemal Aktaş Stadium situated in Küçükçekmece district of Istanbul Province. In the 2022-23 season, they play the home matches at the club-owned training stadium of Florya Metin Oktay Facilities located in the Florya neighborhood of Bakırköy district in Istanbul.

Statistics 

(1): Season in progress

Current squad 
.
Head coach:  Metin Ülgen

Coaching staff

Notable former players 
 Şilan Aykoç, Turkey girls' U-15
 Şevval Dursun,
Berivan İçen, Turkey girls' U-17, Turkey women's,

Former coaches

Kit history

References

External links 
Galatasaray Sports Club official website 
GS Kadın Futbol Takımı (@kadinfutbolgs) • Instagram 

Galatasaray S.K. (women's football)
Galatasaray S.K. (football)
Women's football clubs in Turkey
Association football clubs established in 1905
Association football clubs established in 2012
Association football clubs established in 2021
1905 establishments in the Ottoman Empire
2012 establishments in Turkey
2021 establishments in Turkey
Football clubs in Istanbul
Association football clubs disestablished in 2016
2016 disestablishments in Turkey